Tathra may refer to:
 Tathra, New South Wales, an Australian town
 Tathra National Park, a national park in Western Australia
 Tathra (insect), a genus of crickets in the subfamily Phalangopsinae